Ole Nikolai Ingebrigtsen Strømme (23 February 1876 – 17 February 1936) was Norwegian Minister of Social Affairs in 1933.

1876 births
1936 deaths
Government ministers of Norway